Gymnodamaeidae is a family of oribatids in the order Oribatida. There are about 8 genera and at least 60 described species in Gymnodamaeidae.

Genera
 Adrodamaeus Paschoal, 1984
 Arthrodamaeus Grandjean, 1954
 Austrodamaeus Balogh & Mahunka, 1981
 Gymnodamaeus Kulczynski, 1902
 Jacotella Banks, 1947
 Joshuella Wallwork, 1972
 Nortonella Paschoal, 1982
 Plesiodamaeus Grandjean, 1954

References

Further reading

 
 
 
 

Acariformes
Acari families